Igor Gabilondo del Campo (born 10 February 1979) is a Spanish retired footballer who played as a left midfielder.

He played mainly for Real Sociedad and Athletic Bilbao (six seasons apiece) during his career, amassing La Liga totals of 276 games and 33 goals.

Club career
Gabilondo was born in San Sebastián, Gipuzkoa. A product of Real Sociedad's youth system, he appeared sparingly for the first team in his first two seasons as a professional but went on to become an important element for the Basque club, scoring five La Liga goals in 33 games during the 2003–04 campaign.

In 2006, Gabilondo moved to local rivals Athletic Bilbao on a free transfer, producing roughly the same numbers in his first two seasons combined (59 matches and seven goals). On 7 April 2007, he scored the game's only goal in a home win against Valencia CF.

Gabilondo was used sparingly in 2008–09, but the 30-year-old regained his importance in the following year, netting three times during the season, two of those coming in 4–1 home triumphs against CD Tenerife and UD Almería– Athletic finished eighth.

In 2010–11, veteran Gabilondo was regularly used by Athletic Bilbao, alternating between the starting XI and the substitutes' bench. He equalled a career-best five goals, either from free kicks or long-distance shots, also scoring in a 2–0 home win (3–0 on aggregate)against AD Alcorcón in the 2010–11 Copa del Rey. In what proved to be his final season in Bilbao, he featured 21 times in all competitions but only completed 90 minutes on two occasions. His most significant involvement was opening the scoring with a volley in a 2–0 victory over Paris Saint-Germain in the 2011–12 UEFA Europa League group stage; the team reached the final, in which he was an unused substitute (as was the case in the 2012 Copa del Rey Final, both matches ending in 3–0 defeats).

On 10 July 2012, aged 33, Gabilondo moved abroad for the first time in his career, signing for one year (with an option for a further season) with AEK Larnaca FC in the Cypriot First Division and rejoining former Athletic teammate Ander Murillo. By January 2013 he had departed, with injuries and recently becoming a father cited as the reasons.

International career
On 28 December 2011, Gabilondo equalled Julen Guerrero as the most capped played in the history of the Basque Country regional team. The match against Tunisia was his 12th appearance with the Euskal Herriko Selekzioa.

Personal life
Gabilondo's father José Manuel and his uncle Francisco Javier were both footballers, their careers spent mostly at the Segunda Division B level.

Honours
Athletic Bilbao
Copa del Rey runner-up: 2008–09, 2011–12
Supercopa de España runner-up: 2009
UEFA Europa League runner-up: 2011–12

References

External links

1979 births
Living people
Spanish footballers
Footballers from San Sebastián
Association football midfielders
La Liga players
Tercera División players
Real Sociedad B footballers
Real Sociedad footballers
Athletic Bilbao footballers
Cypriot First Division players
AEK Larnaca FC players
Basque Country international footballers
Spanish expatriate footballers
Expatriate footballers in Cyprus
Spanish expatriate sportspeople in Cyprus